Freedom Finger is a 2019 side-scrolling shooter developed and published by Wide Right Interactive. The game was originally released for Microsoft Windows and Nintendo Switch, and was later ported to PlayStation 4, Xbox One and macOS.

Gameplay 
Freedom Finger is a shoot 'em up where players assume the role of a rookie space pilot, Gamma Ray, where they have to rescue a group of kidnapped scientists. Unlike most shmup games, there are options for melee combat. There's also an option to grab enemies and either use them as shield, or using their guns as power-ups.

Development and release 
The game was announced for Microsoft Windows and macOS on March 4, 2019. On August 29, 2019, the game got its definitive release date and initial platforms, September 27, 2020, for Microsoft Windows and Nintendo Switch, replacing macOS. On March 10, 2020, PlayStation 4 and Xbox One ports were announced, for a March 24, 2020 release. On August 3, 2020, a macOS port was released. On December 3, 2020, Limited Run Games announced a physical PlayStation 4 physical release with a manual that includes the entire source code for the game, under the BSD-4-Clause license according to its programmer Mark Zorn.
The soundtrack for the game was completed by producer and artist Aesop Rock and was released digitally in 2020.

Reception 

Freedom Finger for Nintendo Switch received "mixed" reviews according to the review aggregation website Metacritic. The PlayStation 4 and Xbox One ports received "generally favorable" reviews. Both Nintendo Life and Shacknews rated it 8/10.

Footnotes

Notes

References

External links 

2019 video games
Commercial video games with freely available source code
Horizontally scrolling shooters
Indie video games
macOS games
Nintendo Switch games
Open-source video games
PlayStation 4 games
Shooter video games
Single-player video games
Software using the BSD license
Video games developed in the United States
Xbox One games
Windows games